WLSV (790 AM) is a radio station broadcasting a country music format.  Licensed to Wellsville, New York, United States, the station serves the Olean area.  The station is currently owned by Dbm Communications, Inc. and features programming from ABC Radio's Real Country format.

790 AM is a regional broadcast frequency. The station operates on greatly reduced power at night, having previously been a daytime-only station. The station, Allegany County's oldest broadcast license, has operated since 1955.

References

External links

 

LSV
Country radio stations in the United States